Šulc (feminine Šulcová) is a Czech and Slovak surname, a version of the German family name Schulz. Notable people with the surname include:
 Alan Šulc (born 1990), world record–holding juggler
 Brigita Šulcová (born 1937), Czech opera singer
 František Šulc (born 1950), Czech former handball player
 Jakub Šulc (born 1985), Czech professional ice hockey defenceman
 Jan Šulc (canoeist) (1916–2001), Czechoslovak slalom canoer
 Jan Šulc (footballer), Czech footballer
 Jan Šulc (ice hockey) (born 1979), Czech former professional ice hockey centre
 Jana Šulcová (born 1947), Czech actress
 Jaroslav Šulc (1903–1943), Czech paleontologist, executed by the Nazis
 Pavel Šulc, Czech footballer

See also

Czech-language surnames
Surnames of German origin